Boldbaataryn Bold-Erdene (born June 24, 1983) is a Mongolian cyclist.

Palmares

2005
2nd National Road Championship
2nd National Time Trial Championship
 National Cross Country Champion
2006
2nd National Time Trial Championship
3rd National Road Championship
2008
2nd National Road Championship
3rd National Time Trial Championship
2009
 National Road Champion
 National Time Trial Champion
1st stage 2 Tour of Mongolia

References

1983 births
Living people
Mongolian male cyclists
Cyclists at the 2002 Asian Games
Cyclists at the 2006 Asian Games
Asian Games competitors for Mongolia
21st-century Mongolian people